Arandis is a town in the Erongo Region of western central Namibia. It has been called the Uranium Capital of the World as it is located just 15 km outside the world's largest open-pit uranium mine, the Rössing Uranium Mine.

Established for the workers of Rössing Uranium in 1978, Arandis was granted self–administration and "town" status in 1994.  it has 7,600 inhabitants, most of whom are somehow connected to the mine, and owns  of land.

Besides Rössing, Arandis also serves the Husab and Trekkopje uranium mines. It is the home of the Namibian Institute of Mining and Technology, a technical institute focusing on training skilled industrial workers.

Economy and infrastructure
The 2000s saw a resurgence in economic growth in Arandis. With the global energy crisis, a significant rise in demand occurred for nuclear energy, increasing demand for Arandis' Uranium. Banks, which had previously closed and youth who had previously left the town seeking employment elsewhere, returned. In 2008, negotiations were at an advanced stage for a Chinese company, Namibia Industrial Mining Limited to build a factory for making building materials in Arandis.

After an investment conference was held in 2011, investors have decided to erect a shopping mall in town. Construction of the mall started soon afterwards, the anticipated completion date is May 2013.

Transportation
The Arandis Railway Station is a crossing loop on the Trans-Namib Railway between Swakopmund and Usakos. Arandis Airport is also nearby.

Education 
Namibian Institute of Mining and Technology (NIMT) is a technical vocational training institute in Arandis, Namibia, established in 1991.

There is a secondary school  and a primary school in the Town vicinity namely Kolin Foundation Secondary School and U.B. Dax Primary School.

Politics
Arandis is governed by a town council that has seven seats.

In the 2010 local authority elections SWAPO won the town council with 664 votes. The United Democratic Front (UDF) finished in second place with 243 votes while the Rally for Democracy and Progress (RDP) received 72 votes. SWAPO also won the 2015 local authority elections, gaining 5 seats (780 votes). The remaining 2 seats went to the UDF (295 votes). SWAPO also won the 2020 local authority election but for the first time failed to gain the majority of seats in the town council. SWAPO obtained 551 votes and gained three seats. Runner-up Independent Patriots for Change (IPC, newly formed in August 2020) gained two seats (405 votes), and UDF and Landless People's Movement (LPM) gained one seat each with 230 and 140 votes, respectively.

See also
 List of cities and towns in Namibia
 Uranium mining in Namibia

External links

References

Populated places in the Erongo Region
Towns in Namibia
Mining in Namibia
Populated places established in 1978
1978 establishments in South West Africa